Special Unit 2 is an American sci-fi/comedy television series that aired on UPN for two seasons from April 11, 2001 through February 13, 2002. The series focused upon the exploits of a top-secret Chicago police division known as Special Unit 2, charged with policing the city's large population of mythological beings, known as "Links". It was filmed in Vancouver, British Columbia. It was cancelled after nineteen episodes due to a change in UPN's management.

Plot
"Links" are the common monsters from folklore and mythology (except vampires, whose existence is specifically identified as preposterous), and are described as being the missing link between apes and humans (although other human-like species have evolved, for instance gargoyles, who are identified as humanoid descendants of dinosaurs). They live in hiding and/or disguise among the human population. On occasions when Links are seen by humans, they are usually dismissed as hallucinations or optical illusions, except by those who are especially perceptive. Special Unit 2 is the top-secret division of the Chicago police specifically designated to handle Link-related cases. Other units of the police department are specifically ordered to stay out of Special Unit 2's way, which provides a great deal of leeway and access for cases.

Detective Nick O'Malley (Michael Landes) and his newly assigned partner, Detective Kate Benson (Alexondra Lee), are the two central characters. Nick is a maverick veteran in Special Unit 2. His initially callous, jaded and at times cruel demeanor is revealed to be a result of guilt over the loss of his previous partner; Julie. A criminal called The Chameleon cut her up into "600 inch-sized cubes". (It would later be revealed that Nick and Julie were having a secret affair.) Kate is one of the rare individuals who acknowledge the existence of Links instead of finding a more acceptable (albeit incorrect) explanation for the traditionally unexplained phenomena that they cause. Her refusal to deny her observations jeopardizes her career as a police officer and estranges her from her fellow officers. Kate's tenacity and conviction leads to her recruitment by Special Unit 2.

Supporting characters include Captain Richard Page (Richard Gant), SU2's commanding officer with a prosthetic metal hand that serves as the focus of running gags. The unit's liaison with the Link community is Carl (Danny Woodburn), a verbally aggressive gnome known for kleptomania and armed robbery, who is mutually antagonistic towards Nick. Nick and Carl's love-hate relationship contributes some of the humor within the fantasy universe of the show. Carl is completely invincible to everything but a diamond-coated saw and dragon fire/teeth.

Other members of the unit are the technical experts, who provide background, research and technology on various Links.  Initially the primary technician is the acerbic Link biologist Sean Radmon (Sean Whalen), succeeded in Season 2 by Jonathan (Jonathan Togo), SU2's obsessively enthusiastic technician who analyzes Link evidence and produces a seemingly endless stream of Link-related inventions with positive glee.  Another recurring character introduced in Season 2, is Alice Cramer (Pauley Perrette), who is the Unit's public relations person and acts to convince the press and witnesses that the crimes and strange events committed by Links are merely toxic spills, mass hallucinations, drugged out street gangers, etc. Another recurring character is Jerry (Mike Rad), someone who drifts from job to job and occasionally encounters Links. (For example, in the first episode, Carl attempted to stick him up at the store where he was working.)

The unit further maintains secrecy by hiding the physical location of the unit's headquarters behind the facade of a Chinese laundry.  The detectives drive unmarked cars and utilize sophisticated weaponry and technology to deal with Link threats.

A partial list of Links encountered by SU2 in the course of the episodes include a trash-talking Gargoyle, the scheming Pied Piper posing as a children's television host, the homicidal Sandman, Jack The Ripper and deadly snake-haired Medusa, all revealed to be criminals in these particular cases. Most of the monsters are portrayed as behaving rather human-like, forming urban communities.

Cast
Michael Landes as Det. Nick O'Malley
Alexondra Lee as Kate Benson 
Danny Woodburn as Carl
Richard Gant as Richard Page 
Johnathan Togo as Johnathan

Episodes

Season 1 (2001)

Season 2 (2001–2002)

Home media
On September 14, 2017, it was announced that Visual Entertainment had acquired the rights to the series. They subsequently released Special Unit 2: The Complete Series on DVD in Region 1 on October 6, 2017.

References

External links

 
 

UPN original programming
American fantasy television series
2000s American comic science fiction television series
2000s American comedy-drama television series
2001 American television series debuts
2002 American television series endings
Television series by CBS Studios
Fictional government investigations of the paranormal
Fictional portrayals of the Chicago Police Department
Occult detective fiction
Sandman in television
Television shows filmed in Vancouver